Linda Marguet (born 11 September 1983) is a French runner who specializes in the 800 metres

Biography

In 2011, she qualified for the European Indoor Championships in Paris-Bercy and placed initially 4th  in the final with a run of 2 min 01 s 61, failing by 80 hundredths of a second from third place. But in July 2012, the Russian Yevgeniya Zinurova, who won the race, was stripped of her title for doping. Linda Marguet thus received the Bronze medal. In 2013, she was reclassified again, gaining second in the race, following the positive doping test of Iuliia Stepanova.

At the French national championships of 2012 Linda won the 800 meter race, running 2:03.79.

Achievements

Personal Bests

References

1983 births
Living people
French female middle-distance runners
Athletes (track and field) at the 2009 Mediterranean Games
Mediterranean Games competitors for France
21st-century French women